Thorsby may refer to: 

 Thorsby, Alabama, a town in the United States
 Thorsby, Alberta, a town in Canada